Abraham Lopes Cardozo (1914–February 21, 2006) was  hazzan of Congregation Shearith Israel, the historic Spanish and Portuguese synagogue in New York City.

Biography
Born in Amsterdam, Netherlands, he was the great-grandson of the Chief Rabbi of the Sephardic community in Amsterdam and son of Joseph Lopes Cardozo, musician, and leader of the boy's choir of the Spanish and Portuguese Synagogue. Abraham read his first Haftarah at the age of seven in that same synagogue. He attended the Ets-Haim Seminary in Amsterdam, and became active in youth work and teaching.

In 1939 he was appointed by Queen Wilhelmina to be the rabbi of the Sephardic community in Surinam, where he met his wife Irma. He became assistant hazzan at Shearith Israel in 1946, later becoming the hazzan, and continued there for 50 years to 1986. In addition, he was a faculty member of the Yeshiva University Sephardic Studies Program, where he taught Sephardic hazzanut.

On June 7, 2000, he was invested as a Knight of the Order of Orange-Nassau by Queen Beatrix of the Netherlands.

Rabbi Cardozo died on February 21, 2006.

References

External links
 Music of Abraham Lopes Cardozo
 The Western Sephardi Liturgical Tradition
 Congregation Shearith Israel - The Spanish and Portuguese Synagogue in New York City
 Portuguese Synagoge in Amsterdam
Papers of Abraham and Irma Lopes Cardozo.; ASF AR-8; American Sephardi Federation, New York, NY.
 New York Times obituary
 As I Lived It by Irma Miriam Lopes Carodozo –  – memoirs of Abraham Lopes Cardozo's wife

1914 births
2006 deaths
Hazzans
Dutch Sephardi Jews
Dutch emigrants to the United States
American Sephardic Jews
Knights of the Order of Orange-Nassau
Musicians from Amsterdam
20th-century Dutch male singers
Burials at Beth Olom Cemetery
Rabbis from Amsterdam
20th-century Surinamese male singers